Thomas Jackson Charlton Jr. (born July 12, 1934) is an American competition rower and Olympic champion.

Born in Savannah, Georgia, he won a gold medal in eights with the American team at the 1956 Summer Olympics in Melbourne.
The eight rowers were Yale undergraduates. Charlton was a member of the Class of 1956. He commissioned through Yale Naval ROTC into the U.S. Marine Corps.

References

1934 births
Living people
Olympic gold medalists for the United States in rowing
Rowers at the 1956 Summer Olympics
American male rowers
Medalists at the 1956 Summer Olympics
Yale University alumni